The 2019 Yokkaichi Challenger was a professional tennis tournament played on hard courts. It was the 1st edition of the tournament which was part of the 2019 ATP Challenger Tour. It took place in Yokkaichi, Japan between 5 and 11 August 2019.

Singles main-draw entrants

Seeds

 1 Rankings are as of July 29, 2019.

Other entrants
The following players received wildcards into the singles main draw:
  Yasunori Hashikawa
  Shinji Hazawa
  Yuya Ito

The following players received entry into the singles main draw as alternates:
  John Paul Fruttero
  Courtney John Lock

The following players received entry into the singles main draw using their ITF World Tennis Ranking:
  Benjamin Lock
  Yuki Mochizuki
  Sho Shimabukuro
  Kento Takeuchi
  Jumpei Yamasaki

Champions

Singles

  Yūichi Sugita def.  James Duckworth 3–6, 6–3, 7–6(7–1).

Doubles

  Nam Ji-sung /  Song Min-kyu def.  Gong Maoxin /  Zhang Ze 6–3, 3–6, [14–12].

References

2019 ATP Challenger Tour
2019 in Japanese tennis
August 2019 sports events in Japan
Tennis tournaments in Japan